Tennessee's 20th Senate district is one of 33 districts in the Tennessee Senate. It has been represented by Democrat Heidi Campbell since 2020, following her defeat of incumbent Republican Steven Dickerson.

Geography
District 20 covers many of Nashville's wealthy inner suburbs in Davidson County, including Forest Hills, Oak Hill, Berry Hill, Belle Meade, Goodlettsville, and parts of outer Nashville proper.

The district is located entirely within Tennessee's 5th congressional district, and overlaps with the 50th, 51st, 53rd, 54th, 55th, 56th, 58th, and 60th districts of the Tennessee House of Representatives.

Recent election results
Tennessee Senators are elected to staggered four-year terms, with odd-numbered districts holding elections in midterm years and even-numbered districts holding elections in presidential years.

2020

2016

2012

Federal and statewide results in District 20

References

20
Davidson County, Tennessee